The United States's Cornerstone nuclear test series was a group of 11 nuclear tests conducted in 1988–1989. These tests  followed the Operation Touchstone series and preceded the Operation Aqueduct series.

Gallery

References

Explosions in 1988
Explosions in 1989
Cornerstone
1988 in military history
1989 in military history
1988 in Nevada
1989 in Nevada
1988 in the environment
1989 in the environment